Viola calcarata is a species of genus Viola that grows on mountains of south-eastern Europe. It is commonly known as long-spurred violet or mountain violet. It is a herbaceous flowering perennial plant.

Description 
This plant, up to 15 cm tall, has short and glabrous stem, leafy in the lower part, prostrate, ascendent or suberect.

Leaves 
This plant can show heterophylly: upper leaves can be different from lower leaves. The blade can be more or less elongated, from rounded to lanceolate, with crenate margin. At the base of the petiole there are stipules (5–15 mm long) of various form, from linear and entire stipules to stipules divided in many linear segments, pennate or palmate.

Flowers 
Flower has a big corolla, 2 to 4 cm wide, of various colors: almost yellow in the center, usually with dark violet veins, the outer parts can be violet, blue, yellow or white. Lower petal has a spur 8–15 cm long. Flowering time is from May to August.

Habitat 
This is an alpine plant, usually growing from 1500 m to 2800 m, in meadows and pastures.

References 

 
 

calcarata